The Asian Indoor Athletics Championships were held for the first time in 2004. Run by the Asian Athletics Association, the championships take place biennially in different cities all over Asia.

Editions

Ranking

Medals (2004-2023)

Championship records

See also
 Indoor athletics at the Asian Indoor and Martial Arts Games
 World Athletics Indoor Championships

References

External links 
 Asian Athletics Association

 
Indoor
Athletics
Indoor track and field competitions
Recurring sporting events established in 2004
Continental athletics championships
Biennial athletics competitions